Helena is an unincorporated community in Mason County, Kentucky, United States.

Notes

Unincorporated communities in Mason County, Kentucky
Unincorporated communities in Kentucky